Toifale (died 1829), was a ruling Queen of Uvea between 1825 and 1829.  

She was preceded by Uhila, and succeeded by Mulitoto.

References

Wallis and Futuna monarchs
Queens regnant in Oceania
19th-century women rulers
1829 deaths